{{Infobox person
| name                      =William Allegrezza
| image                     = Sarahlangsbill.jpg
| alt                       = 
| caption                   = William Allegrezza, by Sara Lang
| birth_date                = 1974
| birth_place               = Jackson, MS
| death_date                = 
| death_place               = 
| death_cause               = 
| citizenship               = USA, Italy
| education                 = University of Dallas (1996), LSU (1998), LSU (2003)
| alma_mater                = 
| occupation                = poet, editor, professor
| years_active              = 
| employer                  = Indiana University Northwest
| notable_works             = Step Below: Selected Poems 2000-2015, The Vicious Bunny Translations Fragile Replacements"
| style                     = Experimental
| spouse                    = 
| children                  = 
| parents                   = 
| relatives                 = 
| awards                    = 
| signature                 = 
| signature_alt             = 
| signature_size            = 
}}

William (Bill) Allegrezza (born 1974 in Jackson, Mississippi) is a poet, fiction writer, translator, and critic. He edits Moria Books and teaches at Indiana University Northwest. He has published eighteen poetry books; eleven chapbooks, including Sonoluminescence (co-written with Simone Muench) and Filament Sense'' (Ypolita Press); and many poetry reviews, articles, and poems. His poetry has been translated into Dutch, Spanish, Portuguese, and Italian. He founded and curated series A, a reading series in Chicago, from 2006 to 2010.  He also co-founded Cracked Slab Books and edited it for five years. He edits the blogzine Moss Trill. He earned his PhD in Comparative Literature at Louisiana State University.

Allegrezza started the e-zine Moria, a poetry journal, in 1998. It was one of the early online poetry magazines, and in time, it morphed into Moria Books and Locofo Chaps. Allegrezza moved to Chicago and taught at Columbia College Chicago, Roosevelt University, and Morton College before joining Indiana University Northwest in Gary. In 2006, he started Series A, a reading series that ran for five years and featured many notable writers like Peter Gizzi, Matt Briggs, Cris Mazza, Gina Frangello, and more. He edits the blogzine Moss Trill.  He lives in Munster, Indiana.

Books

To Hush All The Dead (BlazeVox Books)
In The Weaver's Valley (Blue Lion Books)
Collective Instant (Otoliths Press)
The Vicious Bunny Translations (Lulu)
Temporal Nomads (xPress(ed) books)
Covering Over (Moria Books)
La alteración del silencio: poesía norteamericana reciente (Editorial Cuneta)
Ladders in July (BlazeVox Books)
Fragile Replacements (Meritage Press)
The City Visible: Chicago Poetry for the New Century (co-edited with Ray Bianchi) (Cracked Slab Books)
The Salt Companion to Charles Bernstein (Salt Publishing)
Inshore Seeds (Argostist Ebooks)
Densities, Apparitions(Otoliths Press)
Aquinas and the Mississippi (with Garin Cycholl) (Furniture Press)
Step Below: Selected Poems 2000-2015 (Meritage Press)
Stone & Type, Cedar, poems, Lavender Ink, 2019

Book Reviews
Densities, Apparitions
The City Visible
Fragile Replacements
Fragile Replacements

Interviews
Interview with Thomas Fink
Art on the Air
MUD Proposal Interview
Interview with Tom Beckett
Interview with Rob McLennan
I Am Chicago Interview
A Northwest Indiana Life
12 or 20 Interview
Copy Left Interview

External links
His author page
moria
University Profile

Poets from Indiana
Writers from Indiana
1974 births
Living people
Writers from Chicago
Louisiana State University alumni
Poets from Mississippi
21st-century American poets